Thomas Alan Pagnozzi (born July 30, 1962) is an American former professional baseball player. He played his entire 12-year Major League Baseball (MLB) career as a catcher for the St. Louis Cardinals, from  through . A three-time Gold Glove Award winner, Pagnozzi was named to the National League All-Star team in 1992. Besides catcher, Pagnozzi also made 40 appearances at first base and seven at third base during his career.

Baseball career
Pagnozzi was born in Tucson, Arizona. He attended University of Arkansas where he played for the Arkansas Razorbacks baseball team. Initially a backup catcher and utility player for the Cardinals, in 1990. Pagnozzi impressed Cardinals manager Joe Torre enough to move Todd Zeile, then the Cardinals' hot catching prospect, to third base to make room for him. Pagnozzi remained the Cardinals' regular catcher until 1996. Pagnozzi made the National League All-Star team in 1992.

From 1986 to 1990, Pagnozzi played in the Puerto Rican Liga de Béisbol Profesional Roberto Clemente with the Indios de Mayagüez (Mayagüez Indians).

Pagnozzi retired from MLB as a player in 1998 at the age of 36 after having been released by the Cardinals in August. His offensive career totals included a batting average of .253 with 44 home runs and 320 RBI. He placed in the top five in Cardinals franchise history in catcher defensive categories such as games caught, innings, putouts, stolen bases allowed, caught stealing, and fielding percentage.

Tom Pagnozzi's nephew, Matt Pagnozzi, was also a catcher, and made his debut with the Cardinals on September 29, 2009.

See also
 List of Major League Baseball players who spent their entire career with one franchise
 List of St. Louis Cardinals team records
 St. Louis Cardinals award winners and league leaders

References

External links

Pagnozzi Charities

1962 births
Living people
Arkansas Razorbacks baseball players
Arkansas Travelers players
Baseball players from Arkansas
Central Arizona Vaqueros baseball players
Erie Cardinals players
Gold Glove Award winners
Louisville Redbirds players
Macon Redbirds players
Major League Baseball catchers
National League All-Stars
Peoria Chiefs players
Baseball players from Tucson, Arizona
Springfield Cardinals players
St. Louis Cardinals players